Dianne Renwick  is an associate justice of the New York Appellate Division of the Supreme Court, First Judicial Department.

Early life and education
She is a 1982 graduate of Cornell University and a 1986 graduate of Benjamin N. Cardozo School of Law.

Legal career
Prior to joining the bench, she worked as a staff attorney in various divisions of the Legal Aid Society. She subsequently served on the New York City Civil Court from 1997 to 2001 and was a New York Supreme Court Justice from 2001 to 2008. She was designated as a Justice for the Appellate Division, First Judicial Department in 2008 by Governor David Paterson.

See also
List of African-American jurists

References

Living people
New York (state) lawyers
Lawyers from New York City
Year of birth missing (living people)